Willie Shawn Lamont Calhoun (born November 4, 1994) is an American professional baseball left fielder in the New York Yankees organization. He played college baseball at the University of Arizona and Yavapai College. The Los Angeles Dodgers selected Calhoun in the fourth round of the 2015 MLB draft. He made his MLB debut with the Texas Rangers in 2017, and played with them until 2022 where he played with the San Francisco Giants.

Early life

Willie Calhoun is named for his father, a corrections officer at San Quentin State Prison. His mother is Monica. He has a younger sister and a younger brother.

High school

Calhoun attended Benicia High School in Benicia, California, where in three years of baseball as an infielder he batted .435/.513/.736 with 11 home runs and 82 RBIs in 262 at bats. He was named 2012 and 2013 Sac Joaquin All-Section, named a top-150 national prospect by Perfect Game, 2013 third team Rawlings/Perfect Game Preseason All-America, Rawlings/Perfect Game California Region First Team, Solano County Athletic Conference co-MVP, and to the New Balance All-Area Code team.

The Tampa Bay Rays selected him in the 17th round of the 2013 Major League Baseball draft, but he did not sign with the Rays. Instead, Calhoun honored his commitment to play college baseball for the Arizona Wildcats.

College

Calhoun struggled in his lone season at the University of Arizona, batted .247/.345/.301 in 146 at bats playing third base, lost his spot on the team, and considered quitting the sport altogether. In 2014, he played collegiate summer baseball with the Wareham Gatemen of the Cape Cod Baseball League.

In 2015, he transferred to Yavapai College, a community college. With them, he batted .432/.520/.952 with 31 home runs and 85 RBIs in 227 at bats. His 31 home runs were the most by a junior college player since Bryce Harper also hit 31, at the College of Southern Nevada in 2010. Calhoun signed with Kansas State University out of junior college.

Professional career

Los Angeles Dodgers

The Los Angeles Dodgers selected Calhoun in the fourth round of the 2015 MLB draft. He signed with the Dodgers for a signing bonus above $340,000, rather than transfer to Kansas State, and made his professional debut with the Ogden Raptors (with whom he was a Pioneer League mid-season All Star) and was later promoted to the Great Lakes Loons and Rancho Cucamonga Quakes. In 73 games between the three levels, he hit .316/.390/.519 with 11 home runs and 47 RBIs, as he played second base.

To start the 2016 season, Calhoun was promoted to the Double-A Tulsa Drillers of the Texas League. He was selected as a starter for the mid-season Texas League All-Star game, and was also named a Texas League post-season All Star, and selected to the U.S. team for the All-Star Futures Game.  In 503 at bats over 132 games for the Drillers, he hit .255/.318/.469 with 75 runs (2nd in the Texas League), 27 homers (2nd), 45 walks (8th), and 88 RBIs (1st). At the conclusion of the season, he was also named to the post-season all-star team, and an MiLB.com Organizational All-Star. After the season, the Dodgers assigned Calhoun to the Glendale Desert Dogs of the Arizona Fall League. He earned MVP honors in the Fall Stars Game for top prospects playing in the league when he went 3-for-3 with a homer in the game.

Calhoun was promoted to the Triple-A Oklahoma City Dodgers to begin the 2017 season and played well enough to be named the second baseman for the Pacific Coast League mid-season and post-season all-star teams. In 2017 with the team he batted .298/.358/.574.

Texas Rangers

2017-18
On July 31, 2017, Calhoun was traded to the Texas Rangers (along with fellow minor leaguers A. J. Alexy and Brendon Davis) in exchange for Yu Darvish. With Round Rock he batted .310/.345/.566. Between the two teams in the Pacific Coast League (where he entered the season as the 9th-youngest player) he batted .300/.355/.572 with 80 runs (7th in the league), 31 home runs (2nd), and 93 RBIs (2nd) in 486 at bats, and was the 9th-toughest batter to strike out, averaging a strikeout every 8.0 at bats. He was named to the Pacific Coast League Postseason All-Star Team, the Yahoo! Sports All-Minor League Team, and Baseball America'''s Minor League All-Star Second Team. He was promoted to the major leagues for the first time on September 12, 2017. Calhoun hit .265/.324/.353 with a home run and four RBIs for the Rangers in 13 games in 2017, playing 11 games in left field, one at DH, and one as a pinch hitter.

Pre-2018, he was rated the #36 prospect in baseball by Baseball America'', #43 by Baseball Prospectus, and #53 by Major League Baseball. In 2018, Calhoun hit .222/.269/.333 with two home runs and 11 RBIs in 35 major league games, playing 26 games in left field, nine as a pinch hitter, and one as a DH. In 108 games with the Triple-A Round Rock Express, he hit .294/.351/.431 with nine home runs and 47 RBIs.

2019
He came to 2019 spring training 25 pounds lighter. The Rangers optioned Calhoun to the Triple-A Nashville Sounds to open the season. On May 15, he was recalled to replace the injured Elvis Andrus, making his season debut the same day. In the midst of batting .435/.458/.739, he was placed on the 10-day IL on May 22 with a strained left quadriceps. He was reactivated from the IL on June 17, but was optioned back to Triple-A Nashville on July 16 after hitting .225/.267/.408 in a second stint in order to clear a spot for All-Star OF/DH Hunter Pence on the roster. On July 25, he was recalled to replace the injured Joey Gallo, and he played with the Rangers for the remainder of the season.

Calhoun finished the 2019 MLB season batting .269/.323/.524 with 51 runs, 21 home runs, and 48 RBIs in 83 games. He played 71 games in left field, seven games at DH, and five games as a pinch hitter.

2020
On March 8, 2020, during a spring training game against the Los Angeles Dodgers, Calhoun was struck on the right side of his face by a  fastball by lefthander Julio Urías. The impact fractured and displaced Calhoun's jaw, and he was air-lifted by helicopter to a hospital. Calhoun had worn a face shield on his batting helmet previously, but stopped during the prior season.  He underwent surgery for a non-displaced fracture in his jaw to insert a plate and stabilize his jaw the next day.

In 100 at bats over 29 games in the 2020 season, Calhoun hit .190/.232/.260 with one home run and 13 RBIs. His .491 OPS was 2nd-lowest in MLB (min. 100 AB). He played 21 games at DH, six games in left field, and three games as a pinch hitter.

2021
On June 26, 2021, Calhoun suffered a fractured forearm after he was hit by a pitch from Kansas City Royals left-handed pitcher Kris Bubic. He underwent surgery to repair a fracture in his left ulna, and was placed on the injured list.

Calhoun finished the 2021 season hitting .250/.310/.381 with six home runs and 25 RBIs over 284 at bats in 75 games played, playing left field. He played 40 games as a left fielder, 29 games as a DH, and seven games as a pinch hitter. He was one of only 11 major leaguers listed at 5 foot 8 or shorter who were playing regularly.

2022
On March 22, 2022, Calhoun signed a $1.3 million contract with the Rangers, avoiding salary arbitration. After he began the 2022 season with a .136 batting average in 44 at bats, as he played 12 games as a DH, five games in left field, and five games as a pinch hitter, the Rangers optioned Calhoun to Round Rock. In response, Calhoun requested a trade from the Rangers. On June 5, Calhoun was designated for assignment. Calhoun went unclaimed on waivers and accepted an outright assignment to Round Rock. With Round Rock he batted .217/.264/.410 with 5 home runs and 20 RBIs in 83 at bats, playing 12 games in left field and 9 games at DH.

San Francisco Giants
On June 23, 2022, the Rangers traded Calhoun and cash considerations to the San Francisco Giants for outfielder Steven Duggar. On September 18, Calhoun was designated for assignment. On October 12, Calhoun elected free agency.

New York Yankees
On December 31, 2022, Calhoun signed a minor league contract with the New York Yankees organization.

References

External links

Arizona Wildcats bio

1994 births
Living people
African-American baseball players
Sportspeople from Vallejo, California
Baseball players from California
Major League Baseball outfielders
Texas Rangers players
San Francisco Giants players
Arizona Wildcats baseball players
Wareham Gatemen players
Yavapai Roughriders baseball players
Ogden Raptors players
Great Lakes Loons players
Tulsa Drillers players
Rancho Cucamonga Quakes players
Glendale Desert Dogs players
Oklahoma City Dodgers players
Round Rock Express players
Nashville Sounds players
Arizona Complex League Rangers players
Sacramento River Cats players
Twitch (service) streamers
21st-century African-American sportspeople